The members of the 14th Manitoba Legislature were elected in the Manitoba general election held in July 1914. The legislature sat from September 15, 1914, to July 16, 1915.

The Conservatives led by Rodmond Roblin formed the government.

Tobias Norris of the Liberal Party was Leader of the Opposition.

The Roblin government was forced to resign in 1915 after a royal commission initiated by the Lieutenant Governor found evidence of corruption in the awarding of contracts for the construction of new legislative buildings. The house was dissolved and a new election was held in August 1915.

James Johnson served as speaker for the assembly.

There were two sessions of the 14th Legislature:

Douglas Colin Cameron was Lieutenant Governor of Manitoba.

Members of the Assembly 
The following members were elected to the assembly in 1914:

Notes:

By-elections 
None

References 

Terms of the Manitoba Legislature
1914 establishments in Manitoba
1915 disestablishments in Manitoba